HMS Wexham was a  of the Royal Navy.

Their names were all chosen from villages ending in -ham. The minesweeper was named after Wexham in Buckinghamshire.

References
Blackman, R.V.B. ed. Jane's Fighting Ships (1953)

Ham-class minesweepers
Ships built in the United Kingdom
1954 ships
Cold War minesweepers of the United Kingdom
Royal Navy ship names
Ham-class minesweepers of the French Navy